Joseph Payne may refer to:
 Joseph Payne (educationalist) (1808–1876), British educationalist
 Joseph Payne (cricketer) (1829–1880), English cricketer
 Joseph Payne (musician) (1941–2008), British musician
 Joseph Frank Payne (1840–1910), English physician
 Joe Payne (footballer, born 1914) (1914–1975), British footballer
 Joe Payne (musician) (1984–2020), American bassist
 Joe Payne (footballer, born 1999), English footballer